The Glenark Mills or Glenark Landing is a historic textile mill complex on 64 East Street in Woonsocket, Rhode Island.  The original stone section of this mill was constructed 1865 by William Norton and was enlarged with a brick addition in 1885.   Originally a cotton mill, the building was converted for use as a knitting mill and then as a worsted mill.  It was added to the National Register of Historic Places in 1989.

The building has now been converted to apartments.

See also
National Register of Historic Places listings in Providence County, Rhode Island

References

Industrial buildings and structures on the National Register of Historic Places in Rhode Island
Buildings and structures in Woonsocket, Rhode Island
National Register of Historic Places in Providence County, Rhode Island